Isaac Waddington (born 9 August 1999) is an English singer and pianist, who came to national attention when he appeared as a contestant on the TV programme Britain's Got Talent in 2015.

Early life and education
Waddington's singing career began as a chorister at Chichester Cathedral, during which time he also attended The Prebendal School. He went on to become Head Chorister of the cathedral choir and studied at The Portsmouth Grammar School. In 2012, he won the BBC Radio 2 Chorister of the Year competition, leading to an appearance on Songs of Praise.

Career

2015: Britain's Got Talent
On 25 April 2015, Waddington's audition for the ninth series of Britain's Got Talent was broadcast on ITV. The cover of "She's Always a Woman" by Billy Joel, was met with 'four yeses' from the judge panel and received a generally positive response from the press.

Waddington was chosen to go through to the live semi-finals of the competition, performing on the fourth night (28 May). His rendition of Bonnie Raitt's song, "I Can't Make You Love Me" resulted in a standing ovation throughout the stadium. He won the semi-final, going through to the finals. Following his success in the semi-final, Waddington's odds for winning the finals were slashed by betting agencies, with Ladbrokes putting his chances on 9/1. Isaac was unaware of this the whole time.

For the finals, on 31 May, Waddington sang his audition piece, She's Always a Woman, again. It garnered another positive reaction. Head judge Simon Cowell commented on how "little changes" had made a big difference, developing his performance since his initial appearance. Despite finishing fifth overall, with 9.7% of the public vote, he was signed by Cowell's label, Syco, within a week.

2018-present: Singles and EP releases
Waddington released his debut single, 'Nothing's Changed', in February 2018. In 2019, he released one song a week for five weeks, beginning with the song 'Make It Better'. In September 2020, he released a new EP, “Dirty Mile”, named after the titular track. The EP was preceded by the single "Bright Skies", which was praised by NME, opining that the song, "with its euphoric melodies and dramatic, soul-laced vocals, [is] a gorgeous song brimming with optimism."

In 2022, Waddington released his third EP, Still Not Over You.

Personal life
In September 2020, Waddington announced that he would be cycling that month to raise money for the British Red Cross "Miles For Refugees" appeal.

Discography

Extended plays

Singles

References

External links 

1999 births
English male singers
Living people
Musicians from Portsmouth
People educated at The Prebendal School
People educated at The Portsmouth Grammar School
Britain's Got Talent contestants
21st-century English singers
21st-century British male singers